Product of the 80's is collaboration album by Queens rappers Prodigy of Mobb Deep, Big Twins, and Un Pacino. The album was released on October 21, 2008.

Track listing

References 

2008 albums
Prodigy (rapper) albums
Albums produced by Jake One
Collaborative albums